Christophe Bordeau (born 3 August 1968 in Tours, Indre-et-Loire) is a retired butterfly and freestyle swimmer from France, who represented his native country at three consecutive Summer Olympics, starting in 1988. He won two bronze medals in the early 1990s at the European Long Course Championships.

References
 
 

French male freestyle swimmers
French male butterfly swimmers
Swimmers at the 1988 Summer Olympics
Swimmers at the 1992 Summer Olympics
Swimmers at the 1996 Summer Olympics
Olympic swimmers of France
1968 births
Living people
Place of birth missing (living people)
European Aquatics Championships medalists in swimming
Sportspeople from Tours, France
Mediterranean Games gold medalists for France
Swimmers at the 1987 Mediterranean Games
Swimmers at the 1991 Mediterranean Games
Swimmers at the 1993 Mediterranean Games
Mediterranean Games medalists in swimming